Cayley process may refer to:
Cayley's omega process in invariant theory
Cayley–Dickson process for constructing nonassociative algebras